Mohamed Francisco Chikoto (born 28 February 1989) is a Nigerien professional footballer who plays for Algerian club ASM Oran.

Career
He played previously with the number 3 on the shirt for Sahel SC and joined in August 2011 to Platinum Stars F.C. in the South African Premier Soccer League.

In August 2012, Chikoto joined Tunisian Ligue Professionnelle 1 side AS Marsa. He left Tunisia for Cameroonian outfit Coton Sport in July 2013.

In July 2014, Chikoto joined Algerian Ligue Professionnelle 1 side ASM Oran.

International 
He is a member of the Niger national football team. He scored one of the 2 crucial goals against Guinea, that helped Niger qualify to African Nations Cup 2013.

International goals
Scores and results list Niger's goal tally first.

References

External links
 

1989 births
Living people
People from Parakou
Nigerien footballers
Niger international footballers
Beninese emigrants to Niger
Sahel SC players
Platinum Stars F.C. players
AS Marsa players
ASM Oran players
Coton Sport FC de Garoua players
Nigerien expatriate footballers
Expatriate soccer players in South Africa
Expatriate footballers in Algeria
Nigerien expatriate sportspeople in Algeria
Expatriate footballers in Tunisia
Nigerien expatriate sportspeople in Tunisia
Expatriate footballers in Cameroon
Nigerien expatriate sportspeople in Cameroon
Expatriate footballers in France
Nigerien expatriate sportspeople in France
South African Premier Division players
Tunisian Ligue Professionnelle 1 players
Algerian Ligue Professionnelle 1 players
2011 African Nations Championship players
2012 Africa Cup of Nations players
Association football defenders
2013 Africa Cup of Nations players
Niger A' international footballers